Bring 'Em Back Alive is an adventure television series starring Bruce Boxleitner, Cindy Morgan, and Ron O'Neal.

Premise
Frank Buck is big game trapper and collector of wild animals who works out of the Raffles Hotel bar in Singapore during the 1930s fighting a range of villains in pre-war Malaya. He is assisted in his adventures by U.S. Consul Gloria Marlowe, and Ali, Buck's friend and number-one boy.

Cast
Bruce Boxleitner as Frank Buck, big game trapper and collector of wild animals
Cindy Morgan as Gloria Marlowe, United States Consul, Singapore
Clyde Kusatsu as Ali, Buck's friend and number-one boy
Ron O'Neal as H.H., His Royal Highness, the Sultan of Johore
Sean McClory as Myles Delaney, manager of the Raffles Hotel
John A. Zee as G.B. Von Turgo, smuggler and kingpin of the Singapore underworld
Harvey Jason as Bhundi
George Lazenby as Captain Hayward, Head of the Palace Guard

Production
The show was based on a 1930 book, Bring 'Em Back Alive, written by well-known big-game trapper Frank Buck. Buck appeared in several movies, including a 1932 adaptation of the book, and is remembered by serial fans as the star of Jungle Menace. Set in Singapore, it was one of several shows, along with the likes of Tales of the Gold Monkey, to try to capitalize on the public's renewed interest in old adventure serials catalyzed by the cinematic success of Raiders of the Lost Ark. Bruce Boxleitner and Cindy Morgan were cast after having co-starred together in the Walt Disney Productions feature film Tron the same year.

Broadcast
The series was shown in the United States from September 1982 to May 1983. The television series lasted only 17 episodes before being cancelled because of low ratings. The show was scheduled against NBC's top-10 hit The A-Team, and ABC's top-30 hits Happy Days and Laverne & Shirley.

Episodes

Ratings

References

External links

1982 American television series debuts
1983 American television series endings
American action adventure television series
CBS original programming
English-language television shows
Television series by Sony Pictures Television
Television series set in the 1930s
Television shows set in Hawaii